Elbasan is a Unicode block containing the historic Elbasan characters for writing the Albanian language.

History
The following Unicode-related documents record the purpose and process of defining specific characters in the Elbasan block:

References 

Unicode blocks